The 2017 Delray Beach Open was a professional men's tennis tournament played on outdoor hard courts. It was the 25th edition of the tournament, and was part of the World Tour 250 series of the 2017 ATP World Tour. It took place in Delray Beach, United States between February 20 and February 26, 2017. Third-seeded Jack Sock won the singles title.

Singles main-draw entrants

Seeds

1 Rankings as of February 13, 2017

Other entrants 
The following players received wildcards into the main draw:
  Bjorn Fratangelo
  Stefan Kozlov
  Sam Querrey

The following players received entry from the qualifying draw:
  Kimmer Coppejans 
  Steve Darcis 
  Akira Santillan 
  Tim Smyczek

Withdrawals 
Before the tournament
  Daniel Evans →replaced by  Taylor Fritz
  Ryan Harrison →replaced by  Radu Albot
  Thanasi Kokkinakis →replaced by  Mikhail Kukushkin
  Adam Pavlásek →replaced by  Nikoloz Basilashvili

During the tournament
  Steve Darcis

Doubles main-draw entrants

Seeds 

1 Rankings are as of February 13, 2017.

Other entrants 
The following pairs received wildcards into the main draw:
  Philip Bester /  Peter Polansky 
  Bjorn Fratangelo /  Taylor Fritz

Finals

Singles 

  Jack Sock defeated  Milos Raonic, walkover

Doubles 

  'Raven Klaasen /  Rajeev Ram defetated  Treat Huey /  Max Mirnyi, 7–5, 7–5

References

External links
Official website

Delray Beach Open by The Venetian Las Vegas
Delray Beach Open by The Venetian Las Vegas
Delray Beach Open
Delray Beach
Delray Beach Open